Nola minna, the ceanothus nola moth, is a species of nolid moth in the family Nolidae. It is found in North America.

The MONA or Hodges number for Nola minna is 8993.

References

Further reading

 
 
 

minna
Articles created by Qbugbot
Moths described in 1881